The 1988 United States presidential election in Texas took place on November 8, 1988. All fifty states and the District of Columbia, were part of the 1988 United States presidential election. Texas voters chose 29 electors to the Electoral College, which selected the president and vice president.

Incumbent Vice President George H. W. Bush won his home state against Massachusetts Governor Michael Dukakis. Bush ran with Indiana Senator Dan Quayle as Vice President, and Dukakis ran with Texas Senator Lloyd Bentsen.

Texas voted for Bush by a solid 12.6% margin. Texas had been considered a competitive, albeit Republican-leaning, state in the run-up to the election, with Florida being considered the safest of the large states for Bush. Although the final results showed Texas to be more Republican than the nation, Dukakis did indeed perform better in Texas than in Florida, and indeed than in a number of other Southern states, such as South Carolina, Virginia, North Carolina, and Georgia. In particular, in contrast to Florida, Dukakis carried a substantial number of rural counties (including ones away from the Mexican border), including many of those that had voted for George Wallace in 1968. Most of these counties would solidify as Republican counties in 2000, although there were defections in both 1992 (Lee, Calhoun, San Saba) and 1996 (Polk, Hardin).

Bush scored impressive wins in Texas' population centers, including then-typically Republican Harris, Dallas, and Tarrant Counties, all of which he won with at least 57% of the vote, as well as the emerging suburban counties of Collin and Denton, where he got over 2/3 of the vote. He also carried the swing county of Bexar, although Dukakis reclaimed Travis County, a typically Democratic county that had switched to Reagan in 1984.

The election was very partisan, with more than 99% of the electorate voting for either the Democratic or Republican parties.  Every county save five gave either Bush or Dukakis an outright majority; Bee County gave Bush a plurality, while Hudspeth, Lee, and Polk Counties gave Dukakis a plurality. Houston County gave Bush exactly half of its vote. Bush's best county was Ochiltree, which gave him 83.3% of its vote; Dukakis' was Starr, which gave him 84.7%. Starr was Dukakis' strongest county nationally.

, and despite Bill Clinton's two ensuing nationwide election victories (while holding the Republican margin of victory in Texas to single digits both times), the 1988 election constitutes the last occasion when Lee County, Calhoun County and San Saba County have supported the Democratic presidential nominee.

Along with Iowa and Montana, Texas is one of only three states where, as of 2020, Michael Dukakis was the last Democrat to have carried at least one specific county. This is also the most recent election (due to Bush narrowly winning California in 1988) when Texas was not the biggest electoral vote prize won by the Republican candidate.

Texas weighed in for this election as five points more Republican than the national average.

Results

Results by county

See also
 United States presidential elections in Texas
 Presidency of George H. W. Bush

Notes

References

Texas
1988
1988 Texas elections